Aqina, also known as Aqina Port, is a border checkpoint and border crossing in the northern Faryab Province of Afghanistan. It has a train station by the same name, which serves as the second rail service between Afghanistan and neighboring Turkmenistan. Aqina is located in the northern part of Khani Chahar Bagh District, directly adjacent to the border with Turkmenistan. 

Security in and around Aqina is provided by the Afghan National Security Forces, which includes the Afghan Border Force. Every visitor or traveler between Afghanistan and Turkmenistan must possess a valid travel visa.

Rail station and heliport 

Aqina is the southern terminus of a railway line via Imamnazar to Kerki in Turkmenistan, which officially became operational in late 2016. It became one of three railways in Afghanistan.

The rail extension from Aqina to Andkhoy was completed in early 2021. Unknown when it will actually happen, the rail line will eventually become part of a railway corridor through northern Afghanistan.

There is a small dry port with basic facilities in Aqina, which includes a heliport where about a dozen helicopters can be parked.

See also 
 Afghanistan–Turkmenistan relations
 Torghundi (second border crossing between Afghanistan and Turkmenistan)
 Hairatan (border crossing between Afghanistan and Uzbekistan)
 Sherkhan Bandar (border crossing between Afghanistan and Tajikistan)

References

External links 
 
 Search results for Aqina @ Pajhwok Afghan News.
 Information on Aqina rail station with photos

Populated places in Faryab Province
Afghanistan–Turkmenistan border crossings